Sergey Stepanovich Ling (born 7 May 1937) is a Belarusian politician and agronomist. He was Prime Minister of Belarus from 1996 to 2000 and Permanent Representative of Belarus to the United Nations (2000-2002).

References

1937 births
Living people
Politicians from Minsk
Prime Ministers of Belarus
Diplomats from Minsk
Permanent Representatives of Belarus to the United Nations